Abd ol-Baghi Tabrizi was a prominent Iranian calligrapher during the reign of Safavid dynasty. He was specially an expert in the Thuluth, Naskh and Reqa script. He lived during the era of Abbas I and was a student of Alaeddin Tabrizi and Ali Reza Abbassi. He died in 1629.

References 

1500s births
1629 deaths
17th-century Iranian painters
16th-century Iranian painters
Calligraphers from Tabriz